The Bayer designations b Centauri and B Centauri are distinct. Due to technical limitations, both designations link here. For the star

 b Centauri, see HD 129116
 B Centauri, see HD 102964

See also

 β Centauri

Centaurus (constellation)